Krasnoperekopsk is a town of regional significance that was, following the 2014 annexation of Crimea, incorporated into Russia's Republic of Crimea, though the territory is recognised by a majority of countries as part of Ukraine within the Autonomous Republic of Crimea. It also serves as the administrative center of Krasnoperekopsk Raion, although it is not a part of the raion (district). Population: 

It lies on the Dzhankoy-Kherson railroad line (one of the two railroad lines connecting the Crimea and the rest of the continent).

History
The city of Krasnoperekopsk should not be confused with the historic Crimean city of Perekop, which was destroyed in November 1920 during the Russian Civil War, and which is located in a  range to the north of Krasnoperekopsk.  Perekop was depopulated and destroyed as the Crimean Peninsula was invaded by the Soviet Red Army.

In 1936, the settlement became known as Krasno-Perekopsk in honor of the Red Army men who stormed Perekop in 1920. In 1964, the name was changed again to Krasnoperekopsk, and in 1966, it received the status of a city.

On 12 May 2016, Ukrainian authorities renamed the city Yany Kapu as part of its decommunization efforts, but as Crimea is outside of Ukrainian control, this decision has had little practical effect.

Economy and Industry
 Soda Plant , soda alkaline and other different chemicals
 Bromine Plant , halogens halide and other different chemicals

Demographics

Climate
Krasnoperekopsk's climate is mostly dry and hot in the summer, and mild in the winter.

International relations

Twin towns – Sister cities
Krasnoperekopsk is twinned with:
 Dzerzhinsky, Russia

Notes

References

External links

Official website 
Registration card at Verkhovna Rada
Krasnoperekopsk travel Guide in Russian

Cities in Crimea
Populated places established in the Ukrainian Soviet Socialist Republic
Populated places established in 1932
1932 establishments in the Soviet Union
Cities of regional significance in Ukraine
City name changes in Ukraine